The Supreme Court of Myanmar is the highest judicial forum and final court of appeal under the Constitution of Myanmar, existing as an independent judicial entity, alongside the legislative and executive branches. The Court is legally mandated to have 7 to 11 judges, including a Chief Justice.

Jurisdiction 
Without affecting the powers of the Constitutional Tribunal and the Courts-Martial, the Supreme Court of the Union is the highest Court of the Union of Myanmar. The Supreme Court of the Union has both original and appellate jurisdiction in both civil and criminal cases. Moreover, it has the revisional jurisdiction against the judgment or order passed by a court in accordance with law and in confirming the death sentence. Furthermore, it exercises the power of issuing five kinds of writs without affecting the power of other courts to issue orders that have the nature of writs in accordance with law. At the Supreme Court of the Union, cases may be adjudicated by a bench of one Justice or more than one justice or by the Full Bench.

Being the ultimate authority of the entire court system of Myanmar, the Supreme Court of the Union administers and supervises all subordinate courts in Myanmar. It is also entitled the right of submitting the bills relating to the Judiciary to the Legislative, called the Union Parliament (Pyidaungsu Hluttaw) in accordance with the stipulated manners.

History

Development 
The various levels of courts were founded via the Union Judiciary Act, 1948. The first Chief Justice of independent Burma (Myanmar) was a Cambridge-educated lawyer called Dr. Ba U, who later became the 2nd President of the Union of Burma. Dr. Ba U served as Chief Justice from 1948 to 1952.

Facilities 
Until 2006, the Supreme Court of Myanmar was located at No. 89/133 Pansodan Street, between Maha Bandula Garden Street and Pansodan Street in Kyauktada Township, downtown Yangon. The building complex was designed by architect James Ransome, construction of the court began in 1905 and was completed in 1911. 

The current Supreme Court is located at No.54, Thiri Mandaing Street, Naypyidaw, the country's new capital since 2006.

Composition of the court 

The Supreme Court of Myanmar is composed of 7 to 11 Justices: the Chief Justice of the Union and 6 to 10 other Justices. According to the Constitution of Myanmar, remuneration and salary of the Chief Justice of the Union is equivalent to Vice-President of Myanmar and of justices of the Supreme Court of the Union are equivalent to deputy ministers of the Cabinet of Myanmar. The Chief Justice and Justices of the Supreme Court of the Union are entitled to be referred to as "The Honourable".

Appointment process 
The Chief Justice of the Union is nominated by the President of Myanmar. Appointments are officially made by approval of the Union Parliament (Pyidaungsu Hluttaw).

In February 2011, President Thein Sein nominated Htun Htun Oo as Chief Justice. The Pyidaungsu Hluttaw approved his nomination on 17 February 2011. In June 2017, President Htin Kyaw nominated Mya Han, Myo Tint, Soe Naing and Khin Maung Kyi as new justices. Moreover, as Mya Thein was retired from being supreme court justice, a new justice called Myo Win from Pathein was appointed upon nomination of President Win Myint in November 2018.

Current justices of the Supreme Court of the Union

References

My
Judiciary of Myanmar
1948 establishments in Burma
Courts and tribunals established in 1948